Ridgefield Park is a village in Bergen County, in the U.S. state of New Jersey. As of the 2020 United States census, the village's population was 13,224, an increase of 495 (+3.9%) from the 2010 census count of 12,729, which in turn reflected a decline of 144 (−1.1%) from the 12,873 counted in the 2000 census. Of the 564 municipalities in the state, Ridgefield Park is one of only four with a village type of government, though it operates a Walsh Act (city commission) form of government. Of the four New Jersey villages, Loch Arbour also uses the commission form of government, while Ridgewood operates under the council-manager form, and the Township of South Orange Village operates under a special charter form with many characteristics of village government.

Ridgefield Park was formed as a village on June 15, 1892, within Ridgefield Township, based on the results of a referendum passed on June 6, 1892. Overpeck Township was formed on March 23, 1897, to be coextensive with Ridgefield Park village, and was created within Ridgefield Township for the purpose of administering a Board of Education. Portions of the village gained in both 1921 and 1926 were taken from Bogota and Teaneck. On May 31, 1938, Overpeck Township became Ridgefield Park Township. The village was named for the area's terrain.

The village's Fourth of July Parade, first established in 1894, is said to be the longest continuously celebrated such event in New Jersey and one of the oldest in the country. The village eliminated its July 4 fireworks in 2009, citing the $50,000 cost in the face of the difficult economy, but committed to retain its parade.

Geography

The village borders the Bergen County municipalities of Bogota, Hackensack, Leonia, Little Ferry, Palisades Park, Ridgefield and Teaneck.

Unincorporated communities, localities and place names located partially or completely within the village include Overpeck and West View.

Demographics

2020 census
The 2020 United States census counted 13,235 people and 4,795 households in the village. The racial makeup was 37.2% (4,887) White, 4.2% (552) Black or African American, 0.2% (26) Native American, 10.1% (1,327) Asian, 0.1% (13) Pacific Islander, and 11.5% (1,511) from two or more races. Hispanic or Latino of any race were 46.9% (6,160) of the population.

Of the 4,795 households, 89.1% were living in the same housing unit as the year before. The average household size was 2.69.

23.0% of the population were under the age of 18, and 12.5% were 65 years of age or older. 3.14% of the population were veterans. 37.1% of the population were foreign-born persons.   91.3% of those over age 25 had a high degree, and 38.5% of those over age 25 had a bachelor's degree or higher. The mean travel time to work was 31.3 minutes.

2010 census

The Census Bureau's 2006–2010 American Community Survey showed that (in 2010 inflation-adjusted dollars) median household income was $60,656 (with a margin of error of +/− $8,846) and the median family income was $83,189 (+/− $13,092). Males had a median income of $51,781 (+/− $2,949) versus $47,714 (+/− $8,394) for females. The per capita income for the village was $30,893  (+/− $2,038). About 3.1% of families and 5.0% of the population were below the poverty line, including 5.8% of those under age 18 and 10.2% of those age 65 or over.

Same-sex couples headed 34 households in 2010, an increase from the 21 counted in 2000.

2000 census
As of the 2000 United States census there were 12,873 people, 5,012 households, and 3,242 families residing in the village. There were 5,134 housing units at an average density of 1, 145.8/km2 (2,965.5/sq mi). The racial makeup of the village was 78.20% White, 4.10% African American, 0.22% Native American, 7.85% Asian, 0.03% Pacific Islander, 6.50% from other races, and 3.09% from two or more races. Hispanic or Latino of any race were 22.24% of the population.

There were 5,012 households, out of which 29.7% had children under the age of 18 living with them, 49.7% were married couples living together, 11.2% had a female householder with no husband present, and 35.3% were non-families. 29.6% of all households were made up of individuals, and 9.5% had someone living alone who was 65 years of age or older. The average household size was 2.56 and the average family size was 3.24.

In the village, the population was spread out, with 22.4% under the age of 18, 7.2% from 18 to 24, 34.4% from 25 to 44, 23.1% from 45 to 64, and 12.9% who were 65 years of age or older. The median age was 37 years. For every 100 females, there were 91.5 males. For every 100 females age 18 and over, there were 88.6 males.

The median income for a household in the village was $51,825, and the median income for a family was $62,414. Males had a median income of $44,507 versus $35,217 for females. The per capita income for the village was $24,290. About 4.7% of families and 6.7% of the population were below the poverty line, including 6.9% of those under age 18 and 7.5% of those age 65 or over.

Economy
Overpeck Corporate Office Park is located on Challenger Road on the east side of the village (east of I-95), to the south of Bergen County's Overpeck Park. The Office Park also contains an AMC Movie Theater and Hilton Garden Inn Hotel. Corporate residents of Overpeck Corporate Park include the headquarters of Samsung Electronics America and American Stock Transfer.

Government

Local government

Ridgefield Park has been governed under the Walsh Act since 1912. The village is one of 30 municipalities (of the 564) statewide to use the commission form of government, down from a peak of 60 early in the 20th century; Ridgefield Park is one of six Walsh Act municipalities in North Jersey and most are in shore communities. The Board of Commissioners is comprised of five members, who are elected at-large on a non-partisan basis to serve four-year terms on a concurrent basis. The commissioners elect one commissioner as mayor, however the mayor is only responsible for his or her departments and serves as the chair of the commission.

, the members of the Ridgefield Park Board of Commissioners are 
Mayor John H. Anlian (Commissioner of Public Safety), 
William G. Gerken (Commissioner of Public Affairs),  
Adam MacNeill (Commissioner of Revenue and Finance),
Mark C. Olson (Commissioner of Public Works) and 
Wanda C. Portorreal (Commissioner of Parks and Public Property), all serving concurrent terms of office ending on May 21, 2024.

In June 2017, Theresa Kohles was appointed to fill the commissioner seat that became vacant following the resignation of Maggie Boyd. In the 2017 November general election, Kohles was elected to serve the balance of the term of office.

In elections held on May 13, 2008, the four incumbents running for re-election—George D. Fosdick (1,210 votes), Maggie Boyd (1,142), John H. Anlian (1,063) and Hugo R. Poli (1,006)—all won new terms in office. Challenger Adam MacNeill received 1,037 votes to win the seat vacated by Joseph Storer, with Frank Scerbo (653) and Junior Hernandez (458) falling short. The five incumbents won re-election in the May 8, 2012, municipal election, with Fosdick again chosen as mayor.

Federal, state, and county representation
Ridgefield Park is located in the 5th Congressional District and is part of New Jersey's 36th state legislative district.

Prior to the 2011 reapportionment following the 2010 Census, Ridgefield Park had been in the 37th state legislative district. In redistricting following the 2010 census, the borough was in the 9th congressional district, which was in effect from 2013 to 2022.

Politics
As of March 2011, there were a total of 6,593 registered voters in Ridgefield Park, of which 2,249 (34.1% vs. 31.7% countywide) were registered as Democrats, 957 (14.5% vs. 21.1%) were registered as Republicans and 3,382 (51.3% vs. 47.1%) were registered as Unaffiliated. There were 5 voters registered as Libertarians or Greens. Among the village's 2010 Census population, 51.8% (vs. 57.1% in Bergen County) were registered to vote, including 66.4% of those ages 18 and over (vs. 73.7% countywide).

In the 2012 presidential election, Democrat Barack Obama received 3,162 votes here (66.3% vs. 54.8% countywide), ahead of Republican Mitt Romney with 1,508 votes (31.6% vs. 43.5%) and other candidates with 45 votes (0.9% vs. 0.9%), among the 4,768 ballots cast by the village's 7,035 registered voters, for a turnout of 67.8% (vs. 70.4% in Bergen County). In the 2008 presidential election, Democrat Barack Obama received 3,256 votes here (61.6% vs. 53.9% countywide), ahead of Republican John McCain with 1,932 votes (36.5% vs. 44.5%) and other candidates with 47 votes (0.9% vs. 0.8%), among the 5,288 ballots cast by the village's 6,980 registered voters, for a turnout of 75.8% (vs. 76.8% in Bergen County). In the 2004 presidential election, Democrat John Kerry received 2,681 votes here (55.4% vs. 51.7% countywide), ahead of Republican George W. Bush with 2,104 votes (43.5% vs. 47.2%) and other candidates with 31 votes (0.6% vs. 0.7%), among the 4,835 ballots cast by the village's 6,575 registered voters, for a turnout of 73.5% (vs. 76.9% in the whole county).

In the 2013 gubernatorial election, Republican Chris Christie received 55.6% of the vote (1,473 cast), ahead of Democrat Barbara Buono with 43.0% (1,138 votes), and other candidates with 1.4% (36 votes), among the 2,686 ballots cast by the village's 6,694 registered voters (39 ballots were spoiled), for a turnout of 40.1%. In the 2009 gubernatorial election, Democrat Jon Corzine received 1,657 ballots cast (53.7% vs. 48.0% countywide), ahead of Republican Chris Christie with 1,223 votes (39.6% vs. 45.8%), Independent Chris Daggett with 166 votes (5.4% vs. 4.7%) and other candidates with 11 votes (0.4% vs. 0.5%), among the 3,085 ballots cast by the village's 6,753 registered voters, yielding a 45.7% turnout (vs. 50.0% in the county).

Education
The Ridgefield Park Public Schools serve students in pre-kindergarten through twelfth grade. As of the 2020–21 school year, the district, comprised of four schools, had an enrollment of 2,178 students and 180.0 classroom teachers (on an FTE basis), for a student–teacher ratio of 12.1:1. Schools in the district (with 2020–21 enrollment data from the National Center for Education Statistics) are 
Grant Elementary School with 244 students in grades K-6, 
Lincoln Elementary School with 374 students in grades PreK-6, 
Roosevelt Elementary School with 339 students in grades PreK-6 and 
Ridgefield Park High School with 1,189 students in grades 7–12.

Students from Little Ferry attend the high school as part of a sending/receiving relationship with the Little Ferry Public Schools that has been in place since 1953.

The district is one of the small number in the state with schools recognized by the National Blue Ribbon Schools Program in consecutive years, with Grant Elementary School earning the designation in 2010 and Lincoln Elementary School being honored in 2011.

Public school students from the borough, and all of Bergen County, are eligible to attend the secondary education programs offered by the Bergen County Technical Schools, which include the Bergen County Academies in Hackensack, and the Bergen Tech campus in Teterboro or Paramus. The district offers programs on a shared-time or full-time basis, with admission based on a selective application process and tuition covered by the student's home school district.

Transportation

Roads and highways

Highways passing through the village include Interstate 80, Interstate 95 (the New Jersey Turnpike) and U.S. Route 46.

The historic Winant Avenue Bridge, also known as the Route 46 Hackensack River Bridge, crosses the river to Little Ferry.

Public transportation
For much of the 20th century Ridgefield Park was served by the New York, Susquehanna and Western Railroad (NYSW) and the West Shore Railroad, a division of New York Central (NYCRR) at three passenger station in the village: Little Ferry Station, Ridgefield Park station and Westview station.

NJ Transit bus routes 155, 157, 161, 165, 167 and 168 provide service between Ridgefield Park and the Port Authority Bus Terminal in Midtown Manhattan, and the 83 route provides service to Hackensack and the Journal Square Transportation Center in Jersey City.

Popular culture
Scenes in the 1998 movie Rounders, starring Matt Damon and Edward Norton, were filmed in the Elks Lodge.

Notable people

People who were born in, residents of, or otherwise closely associated with Ridgefield Park include:

 Joan M. Clark (born 1922), former United States Ambassador to Malta
 Richard Easterlin (born 1926), professor of economics at the University of Southern California, best known for the economic theory named after him, the Easterlin paradox
 Alex Gaston (1893–1979), MLB catcher who played for the New York Giants and Boston Red Sox
 Milt Gaston (1896–1996), right-handed pitcher in Major League Baseball from 1924 to 1934
 Jimmy Gnecco (born 1973), musician from the band Ours
 Leonard W. Hatton Jr. (1956–2001), special agent of the Federal Bureau of Investigation who was killed in the September 11 terrorist attacks on the World Trade Center when he entered one of the towers to help evacuate the occupants and stayed when the towers collapsed
 John Huchra (1948–2010), astronomer
 James Gordon Irving (1913–2012), commercial illustrator and painter, best known for illustrating the early Golden Guide series of nature books
 Jim Keogh (born 1948), author of nearly 100 books sold worldwide introduced PC programming nationally in his Popular Electronics magazine column in 1982
 Louis F. Kosco (born 1932), politician who served in both the New Jersey General Assembly and the New Jersey Senate
 Robert A. Lewis (1917–1983), co-pilot of the Enola Gay
 George Lowe (1895–1981), relief pitcher who appeared in a single game for the Cincinnati Reds during the 1920 season
 Bobby Messano (born 1954), artist, guitarist and musician
 Dick Messner (1907–1972), band leader who led a sweet-styled dance orchestra bearing his name from about 1938 to about 1942.
 Johnny Messner (1909–1986; class of 1928), bandleader, composer, saxophonist and vocalist during the big band/swing heyday
 Ozzie Nelson (1906–1975), actor
 Lawrence Nuesslein (1895–1971), sports shooter who competed in the 1920 Summer Olympics where he won a total of five medals: two gold medals, one silver and two bronze medals
 Gregory Olsen (born 1945), entrepreneur, engineer and scientist who, in October 2005, became the third private citizen to make a self-funded trip to the International Space Station
 Amelia Stone Quinton (1833–1926), social activist and advocate for Native American rights, who co-founded the Women's National Indian Association in 1883
 Hatch Rosdahl (1941–2004), football player who played for the Buffalo Bills and Kansas City Chiefs
 David Rothenberg (born 1933), Broadway producer and prisoners' rights activist
 Daniel Ruch (born 1983), assistant soccer coach with Virginia Wesleyan who played professionally for two years for the Virginia Beach Mariners  and the Wilmington Hammerheads
 Hal Turner (born 1962), conservative talk radio host
 George Warrington (1952–2007), served as executive director of NJ Transit
 Yoojin Grace Wuertz (born 1980), novelist who wrote the 2017 book Everything Belongs To Us

References

Sources 

 Municipal Incorporations of the State of New Jersey (according to Counties) prepared by the Division of Local Government, Department of the Treasury (New Jersey); December 1, 1958.
 Ridgefield Park 1685–1985 
 Clayton, W. Woodford; and Nelson, William. History of Bergen and Passaic Counties, New Jersey, with Biographical Sketches of Many of its Pioneers and Prominent Men., Philadelphia: Everts and Peck, 1882.
 Harvey, Cornelius Burnham (ed.), Genealogical History of Hudson and Bergen Counties, New Jersey. New York: New Jersey Genealogical Publishing Co., 1900.
 Van Valen, James M. History of Bergen County, New Jersey. New York: New Jersey Publishing and Engraving Co., 1900.
 Westervelt, Frances A. (Frances Augusta), 1858–1942, History of Bergen County, New Jersey, 1630–1923, Lewis Historical Publishing Company, 1923.

External links

 Ridgefield Park official website
 

 
1892 establishments in New Jersey
Populated places established in 1892
Villages in Bergen County, New Jersey
Walsh Act